"Sweet Baby" is a song by American musicians George Duke and Stanley Clarke. It was released in 1981 as the first single of their collaborative debut album The Clarke/Duke Project. Reaching a peak position of No. 19 on the US Billboard Hot 100, the single remained on the chart for a total of twenty weeks. On the Hot R&B/Hip-Hop Songs chart, "Sweet Baby" reached No. 6. The song is also noteworthy for its use of the electric sitar. During concert performances, Duke performed the song with American singer Lynn Davis. Their version appears on Duke's concert DVD Live in Tokyo Japan 1983".

In 1999, the song was recorded by Filipino singer-producer Martin Nievera. Al Jarreau and Lalah Hathaway recorded the song for 2014 tribute album My Old Friend: Celebrating George Duke''.

Track listing

Charts

References

External links

 

1981 songs
1981 singles
1980s ballads
Jazz fusion songs
Smooth jazz songs
Vocal jazz songs
American jazz songs
Jazz songs
Epic Records singles
CBS Records singles
Song recordings produced by George Duke